The 1926 Imperial Conference was the fifth Imperial Conference bringing together the prime ministers of the Dominions of the British Empire. It was held in London from 19 October to 22 November 1926. The conference was notable for producing the Balfour Declaration, which established the principle that the dominions are all equal in status, and "autonomous communities within the British Empire" not subordinate to the United Kingdom. The term "Commonwealth" was officially adopted to describe the community.

The conference was arranged to follow directly after the 1926 Assembly of the League of Nations (in Geneva, Switzerland), to reduce the amount of travelling required for the dominions' representatives.

The conference created the Inter-Imperial Relations Committee, chaired by Arthur Balfour, to look into future constitutional arrangements for the Commonwealth. In the end, the committee rejected the idea of a codified constitution, as espoused by South Africa's former Prime Minister Jan Smuts, but also fell short of endorsing the "end of empire" espoused by Smuts's arch-rival, Barry Hertzog. The recommendations were adopted unanimously by the conference on 15 November, followed by an equally warm reception in the newspapers.

Participants
The conference was hosted by King-Emperor George V, with his Prime Ministers and members of their respective cabinets:

References

Citations

Sources
 
 

Imperial Conference
History of the Commonwealth of Nations
1926 in London
1926 in international relations
William Lyon Mackenzie King
Events in London
1926 in the British Empire
1926 conferences
October 1926 events
November 1926 events
1920s in the City of Westminster
George V
Stanley Baldwin
Winston Churchill